Robert Joseph Collier (June 17, 1876 – November 8, 1918) was the son of Peter Fenelon Collier and a principal in the publishing company P. F. Collier & Son. Upon his father's death, he became head of the company and, for a time, was editor of Collier's Weekly. He was president of the Aero Club of America.

Early life
Collier was born in New York City, the only son of Katherine Louise Collier ( Dunue) and Peter Fenelon Collier. He attended St. Francis College, then transferred to Georgetown University and graduated in 1894, winning the Merrick Medal from the Philodemic Society that same year. He received the degree of A. B. from Georgetown University. He then spent two years at Harvard University and Oxford University.

Career
Collier assumed the role of editor and publisher of Collier's Weekly, where he was known to have converted the illustrations in the publication from black and white ink to color.

Collier was an aviation enthusiast. A friend of Orville Wright and a director of the Wright Company, purchased a Wright Model B aircraft in 1911 and loaned it to the United States Army, which assigned it to Lieutenant Benjamin Foulois. Foulois and civilian Wright Company pilot Phil Parmalee. They used this aircraft to fly along the Rio Grande border of Mexico and the United States in one of the first scouting duties by the U.S. Army using an airplane. Foulois and Parmalee later crashed the airplane into the Rio Grande but escaped from drowning. Having that plane repaired, he then took it to fly Jimmy Hare to film the construction of the Panama Canal by flying over the construction site in the same Wright Biplane, B type. He commissioned a hydro-aeroplane plane to be constructed in 1913 to attempt to cross the Atlantic.

Collier had many influential friends and an active social life. An enthusiast of polo, he encountered many injuries. In 1899, he was playing polo with George Jay Gould I for the Lakewood Team when he fell and broke his collarbone. In 1906 he was playing against Harry Payne Whitney when he took a mallet strike to his eye and tore his eye socket.

Country estate 

In 1901, in Wickatunk, New Jersey Collier constructed his country estate for himself and his wife, Sara Steward Van Alen. He built his summer home on property bought from State Assemblyman John D. Honce. Called "Rest Hill", it was used for many years as the location of personal parties and celebrations including the township Decoration Day celebrations, it was later donated and eventually became the Collier High School. He used the estate partly as a landing strip to fly his plane. The estate had grass tennis courts, Croquet course, extensive horse stables and fox hunting hounds. Spanning many farms and properties, the area was widely used for an annual fox hunt of the "Monmouth County Hounds" which started in East Freehold and ended at the Collier Estate. Collier was known to fly his plane to Freehold, dismount his bi-plane mount a polo pony and lead the fox hunt. He was also known to have commissioned flights overhead to observe the Fox hunt while participating in 1911.

Personal life 

On July 26, 1902, Collier was married to Sara Steward Van Alen (1881–1963) in Newport, Rhode Island. Sara was a daughter of James John Van Alen and Emily (née Astor) Van Alen as well as a granddaughter of William Backhouse Astor Jr. and Caroline Webster Schermerhorn. Before his marriage he dated the showgirl Evelyn Nesbit, amongst others.

In 1914, he developed uremic poisoning from kidney failure at his summer home in Raquette Lake, New York. He died of a heart attack at his dinner table on November 8, 1918, a few hours after arriving home from France. He was in France for work related to the Knights of Columbus and his publishing empire. He was apparently reporting on the war and had press credentials. However, shortly before his return to New York, General Pershing had personally cancelled his press credentials and ordered him home.

His funeral was held in the Church of St. Jean Baptiste on Lexington Ave. Orville Wright, Condé Montrose Nast, Francis P Garvan, Finley Peter Dunne and Joseph Kennedy were some of his pallbearers. His estate was valued at just $2,194. He made no provision in his will for his wife; however, the beneficiaries of the will provided a renunciation of their part of the will so she could receive some funds.

Loss of heir
As detailed in the fourth episode of the first season of the TV series Who Do You Think You Are?, they had a son, Robert Jr., who was born prematurely and only lived for two days, April 22–24, 1903. This little-known fact goes some small way in explaining his frittering away of his fortune, and his wife's decision to leave their country estate to nuns who would take care of children. He wrote a letter to the memory of his son which says in part:
"This is your birthday little boy, your first little anniversary. So, your father's thoughts are with you. Have the dear angels lighted you this candle, and are you happy in their gifts and laughing for love of their bright faces around you? You may not remember the day you visited a dreary place called Earth, a year ago; but your mother and I remember. We were very selfish, I fear, little boy, for we wanted to keep you with us. Your mother is very lonely for you dear. There are times when only you could comfort her. You were to be our little..."
At this point the letter stops and remained unfinished.

Legacy
In his will he made three friends—Peter Finley Dunne, Harry Payne Whitney, and Francis Patrick Garvan—the residuary legatees of his estate and, thus, his publishing company. Collier evidently believed that his wife had sufficient money of her own. In fact, she did not and would receive only a few thousand dollar from her husband's will. Dunne, Whitney, and Garvan renounced the bequest so that Mrs. Collier could benefit fully. In addition to selling the troubled publishing company, his wife donated their home in the Wickatunk section of Marlboro Township, New Jersey to the Sisters of the Good Shepherd who made it a home for troubled young women. This was later opened up to children of all ages and became Collier High School.

He was largely responsible for starting the Lincoln Farm Association which raised money to purchase the Lincoln birthplace estate which was then donated and turned into a National Park.

During World War II, a Liberty Ship was named in honor of Robert J Collier. Following the war, it was ordered to Belgium with a load of coal but was lost when it ran aground in the Scheldt Estuary.

In 1910, Collier, as president of the Aero Club of America, commissioned Baltimore sculptor Ernest Wise Keyser to make the  Aero Club of America Trophy. First awarded in 1911 to Glenn H. Curtiss for his successful development of the hydro-aeroplane. Collier presented his namesake trophy several times before his death in 1918; after his World War I service. In 1922, when the Aero Club dissolved, the award was taken over by the National Aeronautic Association (NAA) and it was unofficially renamed the Robert J. Collier Trophy, which became official in 1944. The award is presented once a year by the NAA president for "the greatest achievement in aeronautics or astronautics in America, with respect to improving the performance, efficiency, and safety of air or space vehicles, the value of which has been thoroughly demonstrated by actual use during the preceding year." The trophy is permanently displayed at the U.S. National Air and Space Museum.

In popular culture
He was portrayed by Phillip Reed in the 1955 film on Evelyn Nesbit, The Girl in the Red Velvet Swing.

References

External links

 

1876 births
1918 deaths
American publishers (people)
Astor family
Georgetown University alumni
Harvard University alumni
Alumni of the University of Oxford
People from Marlboro Township, New Jersey
Collier (publishing company)
Philodemic Society members
American military personnel of World War I